The Crimes Against Humanity and War Crimes Act (CAHWCA) is a statute of the Parliament of Canada. The Act implements Canada's obligations under the Rome Statute of the International Criminal Court. In passing the Crimes Against Humanity and War Crimes Act on 24 June 2000 and having royal assent given on 29 June 2000, Canada became the first country in the world to incorporate the obligations of the Rome Statute into its domestic laws. It replaced earlier 1987 legislation targeting Nazi war criminals passed in the immediate wake of the Deschênes Commission.

Content
Like the Rome Statute, the CAHWCA criminalizes genocide, crimes against humanity, and a variety of war crimes. A person in Canada may be prosecuted for these offences even if the acts were committed outside of Canadian territory. However, the Act stipulates that no prosecution for these crimes can be proceeded without the personal consent in writing of the Attorney General or the Deputy Attorney General. In order to fully implement the Rome Statute, the CAHWCA amended the Criminal Code, the Extradition Act, and the Mutual Legal Assistance in Criminal Matters Act.

Trials

On 19 October 2005, Désiré Munyaneza, a Rwandan immigrant living in Toronto, became the first person arrested and charged with an offence under the CAHWCA. Munyaneza was charged with two counts of genocide, two counts of crimes against humanity, and three counts of war crimes for actions allegedly committed in Rwanda in 1994.

On 22 May 2009, Munyaneza was convicted of all charges and is the first person to have been convicted under the CAHWCA. On 29 October 2009, Munyaneza was sentenced to life in prison with no chance of parole for 25 years. On 7 May 2014, the Quebec Court of Appeal unanimously dismissed his appeal, thereby affirming his conviction. On 18 December 2014, the Supreme Court of Canada denied his motion for leave to appeal, thus definitively cementing the guilty verdict.

A second Rwandan, Jacques Mungwarere, was charged with "an act of genocide" under the Act on 7 November 2009. The Royal Canadian Mounted Police alleged that he committed this act in the western Rwandan city of Kibuye, and that his case is connected to that of Munyaneza. Mungwarere has claimed that the accusations made against him were fabricated. On 5 July 2013, Mungwarere was acquitted by Judge Michel Charbonneau of the Ontario Superior Court of Justice.

Notes

External links
 Crimes against Humanity and War Crimes Act, S.C. 2000, c.24.

Canadian federal legislation
Canadian criminal law
International Criminal Court
2000 in Canadian law
Rome Statute of the International Criminal Court